Chippendale may refer to:

People
Alfreda Chippendale (1842–1887), American actress
Chipps Chippendale, mountain bike magazine editor
Thomas Chippendale (c. 1718–1779), English cabinetmaker, namesake of Chippendale furniture
Thomas Chippendale, the younger (1749–1822), cabinetmaker, son of Thomas Chippendale
William Chippendale (1730s-1802), English merchant
William Henry Chippendale (1801–1888), English actor

Others
Chippendale, New South Wales, a Sydney suburb
Chippendale Society, a British charity promoting furniture craftsmanship
Chippendales, an American male dance troupe
Chippendales Audition, a 1990 Saturday Night Live comedy sketch
Chairface Chippendale, a supervillain character from the Tick comics
Chinese Chippendale (architecture), an architectural detail derived from Thomas Chippendale's Chinese-influenced work

See also

Chip 'n' Dale, cartoon duo
Chip an' Dale, a 1947 short film starring Chip and Dale
Chip 'n Dale: Rescue Rangers (disambiguation)

English-language surnames